Fung Wong Wu is a village in Ta Kwu Ling, North District, Hong Kong.

Administration
Fung Wong Wu is a recognized village under the New Territories Small House Policy.

History
At the time of the 1911 census, the population of Fung Wong Wu was 84. The number of males was 39.

References

External links

 Delineation of area of existing village Fung Wong Wu (Ta Kwu Ling) for election of resident representative (2019 to 2022)

Villages in North District, Hong Kong